Jo Novita (born 19 November 1981) is an Indonesian former badminton player. She won gold medals in the women's doubles at the Southeast Asian Games in 2003, and in the team event in 2001 and 2007. She won the World Grand Prix tournament title in Thailand and Philippines Open. Novita also competed at the 2004 Summer Olympics and 2006 Asian Games.

Career 
At the 2004 Summer Olympics, she was partnered with partner Lita Nurlita in the women's doubles. They had a bye in the first round and were defeated by Yang Wei and Zhang Jiewen of China in the round of 16. She was a partner with Greysia Polii on the Indonesian Uber Cup (women's international) team which finished second to China in the 2008 series. In October 2008, she teamed with Rani Mundiasti in women's doubles to become runner-up at the Denmark Super Series after losing to the Malaysian pair of Chin Eei Hui and Wong Pei Tty in the final.

Personal life 
Novita married her teammates from Tangkas club Ronne Maykel Runtolalu, in Jakarta, 2 August 2009. She later moved to Canada, and joined her husband who had already been a coach at ClearOne badminton centre in Richmond, British Columbia.

Achievements

Asian Championships 
Women's doubles

Southeast Asian Games 
Women's doubles

BWF Superseries (1 runner-up) 
The BWF Superseries, which was launched on 14 December 2006 and implemented in 2007, was a series of elite badminton tournaments, sanctioned by the Badminton World Federation (BWF). BWF Superseries levels were Superseries and Superseries Premier. A season of Superseries consisted of twelve tournaments around the world that had been introduced since 2011. Successful players were invited to the Superseries Finals, which were held at the end of each year.

Women's doubles

  BWF Superseries tournament

BWF Grand Prix (3 titles, 3 runners-up) 
The BWF Grand Prix had two levels, the Grand Prix and Grand Prix Gold. It was a series of badminton tournaments sanctioned by the Badminton World Federation (BWF) and played between 2007 and 2017. The World Badminton Grand Prix was sanctioned by the International Badminton Federation from 1983 to 2006.

Women's doubles

Mixed doubles

 BWF Grand Prix Gold tournament
 BWF & IBF Grand Prix tournament

Performance timeline

Indonesian team 
 Junior level

 Senior level

Individual competitions 
 Senior level

References

External links 
 
 
 
 
 

1981 births
Living people
Sportspeople from Jakarta
Indonesian people of Chinese descent
Indonesian female badminton players
Badminton players at the 2004 Summer Olympics
Olympic badminton players of Indonesia
Badminton players at the 2006 Asian Games
Asian Games competitors for Indonesia
Competitors at the 2001 Southeast Asian Games
Competitors at the 2003 Southeast Asian Games
Competitors at the 2005 Southeast Asian Games
Competitors at the 2007 Southeast Asian Games
Southeast Asian Games gold medalists for Indonesia
Southeast Asian Games silver medalists for Indonesia
Southeast Asian Games bronze medalists for Indonesia
Southeast Asian Games medalists in badminton
Indonesian emigrants to Canada